Subang is a district in Kuningan Regency, West Java, Indonesia.

Villages
Subang consists of 7 villages namely:
 Bangunjaya
 Gunungaci
 Jatisari
 Pamulihan
 Situgede
 Subang
 Tangkolo

References

External links
  

Kuningan Regency
districts of West Java